The 2003 season was the New Orleans Saints' 37th in the National Football League and their 28th playing home games at the Louisiana Superdome. They failed to improve on their 9–7 record from 2002 and finished with a record of 8–8.

This was the season of the River City Relay, a play that has gone down in NFL lore from a week 16 game against the Jacksonville Jaguars. The Saints were 7–7 and needed a victory to keep their postseason hopes alive. The Jaguars held a 20–13 lead with seven seconds left in regulation, and the Saints had possession on their own 25. In a scene evoking memories of The Play, Aaron Brooks passed to Donté Stallworth for 42 yards, Stallworth lateraled to Michael Lewis for 7 yards, Lewis lateraled to Deuce McAllister for 5 yards, and McAllister lateraled to Jerome Pathon for 21 yards and a touchdown. The score was 20–19, leaving only the extra point to force overtime. However, in an unlikely twist, John Carney, who in his career made 98.4% of extra points attempted and had not missed one in a full decade, inexplicably missed the kick wide right, causing the Saints to miss the playoffs for the third consecutive season and 10th time in the past 11.

Offseason

NFL Draft

Personnel

Staff

Roster

Regular season

Schedule 
During the 2003 regular season, the Saints’ non-division opponents were primarily from the NFC East and AFC South, based on the NFLʼs schedule rotation. They also played the Seattle Seahawks  and Chicago Bears based on the teams'  divisional placement.

Standings

References

External links 
 2003 New Orleans Saints at Pro-Football-Reference.com

New Orleans Saints seasons
New Orleans Saints
New